Janne Sophie Engeleiter (born 18 August 1995) is a German Paralympic athlete who competes in sprinting and long jump events at international elite events. She is a multiple European medalist in 100 metres.

References

External links
 
 

1995 births
Living people
People from Rathenow
Paralympic athletes of Germany
German female sprinters
German female long jumpers
Athletes (track and field) at the 2016 Summer Paralympics
Medalists at the World Para Athletics European Championships
Athletes (track and field) at the 2020 Summer Paralympics
Sportspeople from Brandenburg
20th-century German women
21st-century German women
Visually impaired sprinters
Visually impaired long jumpers
Paralympic sprinters
Paralympic long jumpers